Nicole Taylor may refer to:

Nicole A. Taylor, American cookbook author and podcast host
Nicole Taylor (cricketer), Australian cricketer
Nicole Taylor (screenwriter), Scottish screenwriter
Niki Taylor (born 1975), American model
 Nicole Helen Taylor, singer in the band Taylor Red